The Liu Chi-hsiang Art Gallery and Memorial Hall is an art gallery and memorial hall in Liouying District, Tainan, Taiwan.

History

The art gallery and memorial hall building used to be the house of Liu Chi-hsiang, a local painter. It was later abandoned for several years. The building was renovated extensively by the Cultural Affairs Bureau of Tainan City Government over two years at a cost of NT$23 million. It was finally opened to the public in late 2018.

Architecture
The art gallery and memorial hall is housed in a 2-story building. It also features a coffee shop house in a single-story building in front of the art gallery and memorial hall building. The building used to be Liu's studio.

Transportation
The building is accessible within walking distance west of Liuying Station of Taiwan Railways.

See also
 List of museums in Taiwan

References

External links

 

2018 establishments in Taiwan
Buildings and structures in Tainan
Art museums and galleries in Taiwan
Monuments and memorials in Taiwan
Tourist attractions in Tainan